The 1940 United States presidential election in Iowa took place on November 5, 1940, as part of the 1940 United States presidential election. Iowa voters chose 11 representatives, or electors, to the Electoral College, who voted for president and vice president.

Iowa was won by Wendell Willkie (R–New York), running with Minority Leader Charles L. McNary, with 52.03% of the popular vote, against incumbent President Franklin D. Roosevelt (D–New York), running with Secretary Henry A. Wallace, with 47.62% of the popular vote.

This is the fourth most recent election in which Iowa voted for a different candidate than neighboring Wisconsin, a phenomenon that has only repeated three times since - in 1976, 2004, and 2020.

Results

Results by county

See also
 United States presidential elections in Iowa

References

Iowa
1940
1940 Iowa elections